Pejman Jamshidi (born September 1, 1977) is an Iranian actor and former footballer. His performances in the films The Misunderstanding (2018), Shishlik (2021) and Grassland (2022), My Name Is Love (2023) earned him Crystal Simorgh nominations.

Club career statistics

 Assist Goals

Honours 
Persepolis
Iran Pro League (1): 2001–02
Pas
Iran Pro League : Runner-up 2005–06

Filmography

Film

Web

Television

Awards and nominations

References
 Pejman Jamshidi at PersianLeague.com

External links 
 
 

Iranian footballers
Iran international footballers
Persian Gulf Pro League players
F.C. Aboomoslem players
Saipa F.C. players
Pas players
Steel Azin F.C. players
Foolad FC players
Persepolis F.C. players
1977 births
Living people
Iranian television talk show hosts
Iranian male television actors
Iranian male stage actors
Iranian male film actors
Association football midfielders